Vernon Reginald Pinkney (born May 27, 1955) is a former American football defensive back. He played five seasons in the National Football League, two with the Detroit Lions and three with the Baltimore Colts. Pickney was drafted 166th overall in the 1977 NFL Draft after an All-Conference career at East Carolina University.

Pinkney was born St. Louis, Missouri, but grew up in Fort Bragg, North Carolina. He is the father of Patrick Pinkney, former quarterback at East Carolina, and Aaron Curry, former linebacker of the Oakland Raiders.

References

1955 births
Living people
American football defensive backs
East Carolina Pirates football players
Detroit Lions players
Baltimore Colts players
Players of American football from St. Louis
People from Fort Bragg, North Carolina